Other Men's Daughters is a 1918 American silent drama film directed by Carl Harbaugh and starring Peggy Hyland, Eric Mayne and Riley Hatch.

Cast
 Peggy Hyland as Shirley Reynolds
 Eric Mayne as Shirley's Father
 Elizabeth Garrison as 	Shirley's Mother
 Regina Quinn as 	Lola Wayne
 Riley Hatch as Lola's Father
 Frank Goldsmith as 	Trask
 Robert Middlemass as Richard Ormsby

References

Bibliography
 Connelly, Robert B. The Silents: Silent Feature Films, 1910-36, Volume 40, Issue 2. December Press, 1998.
 Munden, Kenneth White. The American Film Institute Catalog of Motion Pictures Produced in the United States, Part 1. University of California Press, 1997.
 Solomon, Aubrey. The Fox Film Corporation, 1915-1935: A History and Filmography. McFarland, 2011.

External links
 

1918 films
1918 drama films
1910s English-language films
American silent feature films
Silent American drama films
American black-and-white films
Fox Film films
Films directed by Carl Harbaugh
1910s American films